Kelleigh Carlyle Bannen (born February 18, 1981) is an American country music singer and host of Apple Music's Beats 1 "Today's Country" radio show. She debuted in 2012 with the single "Sorry on the Rocks", which has charted on Hot Country Songs. The song received three stars from Billy Dukes of Taste of Country, who compared her voice to Terri Clark but criticized the production. Her second single, "Famous", charted in 2014, followed by "You Are What You Love". Bannen's album, "Favorite Colors", was released in 2019, produced by Jaren Johnston.

Family life
Kelleigh Carlyle Bannen was born February 18, 1981, in Nashville, Tennessee. When she was just 5 years old, she started playing the  violin. Her first violin was made out of a Cracker Jack box and a paint stirrer. Her brother, Thomas Grant, died on her birthday in 2008 of a drug overdose. Subsequent to that Kelleigh embarked on a memory tour benefiting the Hazelden Foundation, which in 2014 merged with the Betty Ford Center, to become the Hazelden Betty Ford Foundation. She also began advocating for AA, and the National Council on Alcoholism and Drug Dependence.

Kelleigh is the host of the podcast "This Nashville Life" alongside producer, Kevin Sokolnicki.  On October 29, 2019, Kelleigh made her national television debut on the Today show with Hoda and Jenna.

Discography

Albums

Singles

Music Videos

References

External links
 Official website

American country singer-songwriters
American women country singers
EMI Records artists
People from Nashville, Tennessee
Living people
1981 births
Singer-songwriters from Tennessee
21st-century American women singers
Country musicians from Tennessee